SCAP may refer to:
 S.C.A.P., an early French manufacturer of cars and engines
 Security Content Automation Protocol
 The Shackled City Adventure Path, a role-playing game
 SREBP cleavage activating protein
 Supervisory Capital Assessment Program, a series of bank stress tests
 Supreme Commander for the Allied Powers, a position held by General Douglas MacArthur during the Occupation of Japan following World War II